Here is a list of schools in Harford County, Maryland. Both public schools, independent schools and some parochial schools are listed.

Elementary schools

 Abingdon Elementary School
 Bakerfield Elementary School
 Bel Air Elementary School
 Church Creek Elementary School
 Churchville Elementary School
 Darlington Elementary School
 Deerfield Elementary School
 Dublin Elementary School
 Edgewood Elementary School
 Emmorton Elementary School
 Forest Hill Elementary School
 Forest Lakes Elementary School
 Fountain Green Elementary School 
 George D. Libby Elementary School at Hillsdale
 Hall's Cross Road Elementary School
 Harford Academy 
 Harford Christian School
 Harford Day School
 Harford Friends School
 Havre de Grave Elementary School
 Hickory Elementary School
 Homestead/Wakefield Elementary School
 Jarrettsville Elementary School
 Joppatowne Elementary School
 Liberty Leadership - An Acton Academy
 Magnolia Elementary School
 Meadowvalle Elementary School
 Norrisville Elementary School
 Northbend Elementary School
 North Harford Elementary School
 Prospect Mill Elementary School
 Red Pump Elementary School
 Ring Factory Elementary School
 Riverside Elementary School
 Roye-Williams Elementary School
 Trinity Lutheran Elementary School
 Old Post Road Elementary School
 William S. James Elementary School
 Youth's Benefit Elementary School (YBES)

Middle schools

 Aberdeen Middle School
 Bel Air Middle School
 Edgewood Middle School
 Fallston Middle School
 Harford Christian School
 Harford Day School
 Harford Friends School
 Havre de Grace Middle School
 Magnolia Middle School
 North Harford Middle School
 Patterson Mill Middle School
 Southampton Middle School

High schools

 Aberdeen High School
 Bel Air High School
 C. Milton Wright High School
 Edgewood High School
 Fallston High School
 Harford Technical High School
 Havre de Grace High School
 Joppatowne High School
 Patterson Mill High School
 North Harford High School

Private high schools
 Harford Christian School
 The John Carroll School
 New Covenant Christian School

Harford County